Volley Soverato is an Italian women's volleyball club based in Soverato and currently playing in the Serie A2.

Previous names
Due to sponsorship, the club have competed under the following names:
 Frigorcarni Soverato (2010–2011)
 Assitur Corriere Espresso Soverato (2011–2012)
 Volley Soverato (2012–present)

History
The club was founded in 1994 and it played in the lower leagues (serie D and C) it reach the Serie B2 in 2000 and the Serie B1 in 2002. In the next following seasons the club struggled to remain in the Serie B1, until the president decided to build a team to fight for the promotion playoffs. After a total of eight seasons at Serie B1, the club achieved promotion to Serie A2 on 25 April 2010. The first two seasons at Serie A2 (2010–11 and 2011–12) proved difficult for the club, who fought to stay in the league. In the following two seasons (2012–13 and 2013–14) the club improved and reached the promotion playoffs. It had a bad season in 2014–15, finishing in the bottom four and avoided relegation by winning a play-out.

Team
Season 2017–2018, as of September 2017.

References

External links

 Official website 

Italian women's volleyball clubs
Volleyball clubs established in 1994
1994 establishments in Italy
Sport in Calabria